Dumdi Dumdi (Hangul: 덤디덤디; RR: Deomdi Deomdi, stylized as DUMDi DUMDi) is the first single album by South Korean girl group (G)I-dle. The single album was released digitally and physically on August 3, 2020, by Cube Entertainment in Korean and Chinese version. The physical version is available in two versions: "Day" and "Night". The single contains two tracks, including lead single of the same name. The group participated in visual concept planning such as hair, makeup and styling, and leader Soyeon participated in lyrics, composition and arrangement. Commercially, the album recorded 94,587 copies of one-week sales, making (G)I-dle the second girl group to break the single album sales record.

Background and promotions
Following the release of I Trust with "Oh My God" on April 6, and "I'm the Trend" on July 7, it was announced on July 14, (G)I-dle would be making a comeback in early August. On July 17, the group unveiled the song name and release date through an artwork teaser image decorated with beaches and palm trees that expresses the heat and passion of summer. Three hours before, the song was first teased by Cube with video with the phrase "#DDDD".

Starting from July 21, Cube Entertainment released individual comments about the song to the press with their concept photos. Through this, (G)I-dle showcased their individual colours and concepts. Member Soojin commented that the song is an exciting song that you'll want to dance to if you listen to it. With the released of Minnie's teaser photo, the media reported that the group's concept is "A wanderer who enjoys freedom". According to Soyeon, the song is a bright and easy-going song with straightforward, intuitive lyrics and addictive melodies that expresses (G)I-dle's type of summer. "I hope you enjoy the summer while listening to our fiery, trendy and refreshing song. Furthermore, Yuqi commented, "It's good to listen when you're driving, or when you go out with friends". She described the song as a dance song where listeners can feel (G)I-dle's special summer with melodies reminiscent of summer and youth. Lastly, youngest member, Shuhua commented that the song is "very exciting and bright song".

For the release of Dumdi Dumdi, (G)I-dle took part in Naver's Happybean Good Action event. The donations collected through the campaign will be used to support psychological and mental health counseling treatment, snacks and nutritional kits for medical staff through Sports Doctors during the COVID-19 pandemic in South Korea.

On August 3, the group held a media showcase which was viewed by selected media attendees from around the world before the song's digital release, hosted by broadcaster Ha Ji-young. The group performed the single and introduced its point choreography, 'Drum Dance'.

Artwork and packaging
(G)I-dle released two album versions for Dumdi Dumdi. The album released in the form of a sticker book-like physical album with Day version that captures the mid-day sunshine and the coolness of the pool, and the Night version with (G)I-dle's special home party scene.

Singles

"I'm the Trend" was announced on June 28, 2020, and was unveiled during their first online concert I-Land: Who Am I on July 5, 2020. The single was released digitally on July 7, 2020. The song was composed by members Minnie and Yuqi, Yuto of Pentagon and FCM Houdini. It was described as a Latin music-based dance song that boasts an exciting rhythm, features lyrics that reference their other hit songs as points such as "Oh My God", "Blow Your Mind", "Latata", "Lion", "Maze", "Uh-Oh" and "Senorita". The song failed to chart on Billboard's World Digital Songs chart but charted at number 96 on South Korea's Gaon Digital Chart.

"Dumdi Dumdi" is (G)I-dle's summer type dance song with tropical drum beats and a strong moombahton rhythm with booming percussion, and a subtle "catchy" whistle hook and the onomatopoeic refrain of "Dumdi Dumdi". It features candid and intuitive lyrics and addictive melodies such as 'hot, cool, passion, and excitement' that reminiscent of summer and youth.

Commercial performance
On July 17, Biz Enter revealed Cube Entertainment's share price went up to 4.42% from the previous trading day at 11:55 am KST after announcing (G)I-dle's comeback schedule.

According to Hanteo, (G)I-dle's single album Dumdi Dumdi, ranked second on Hanteo Weekly Physical Album Chart and recorded 94,587 copies sold after the first week. This puts Dumdi Dumdi as the second best selling girl group single album in history. Simultaneously, the single album charted at number two on the Gaon Album Chart and Gaon Retail Album with 73,826 units.

On August 18, 2020 (G)I-dle achieved 500 million streaming cumulatively on Spotify. They are the first K-pop 4th generation girl group and the fifth in the K-pop girl group's career in about two years and three months after their debut.

Track listing

Notes

 "Dumdi Dumdi" (Chinese version) is written and guide by Yuqi and Z KING.

Charts

Certifications and sales

Release history

References

External links

(G)I-dle albums
2020 albums
Korean-language albums
Single albums
Dance-pop albums by South Korean artists
Cube Entertainment albums
Albums produced by Jeon So-yeon
Albums produced by Minnie (singer)
Albums produced by Song Yuqi
Albums produced by Yuto